The 12th Golden Melody Awards ceremony was held at the Chiang Kai-shek Cultural Center （高雄市立中正文化中心） in Kaohsiung, Taiwan, on 5 May 2001.

References

External links
  12th Golden Melody Awards nominees
  12th Golden Melody Awards winners

Golden Melody Awards
Golden Melody Awards
Golden Melody Awards
Golden Melody Awards